Yennora is a suburb of Sydney in the state of New South Wales, Australia, 29 kilometres west of the Sydney central business district. The residential part of the suburb is primarily in the local government area of the City of Fairfield, although the industrial area in west is a part of Cumberland Council. It is part of the Greater Western Sydney region.

History
Yennora is an Aboriginal word meaning walking or to stroll. Aboriginal people from the Cabrogal tribe, a sub-group of the Gandangara tribe, have lived in the Fairfield area for over 30,000 years.

European settlement began in Fairfield in the early 19th century. A siding platform was built by the New South Wales Government Railways in 1927 and given the name Yennora. The public school was opened in 1955 and the Wool Stores were established in June 1971.

Commercial area

A portion of Yennora is dominated by an industrial zone, which includes the 300,000m2 Yennora Distribution Centre. It was opened in June 1971 as the Yennora Wool Centre. The Yennora Distribution Centre has a connection to the Main Southern railway line, and is used by Quve for freight services running between Port Botany and the suburb. Other key operators in the area include Toll Group, Woolworths, Linfox, Queensland Rail, and Hume Building Products.

Although the suburb's commercial area is vastly industrial, Yennora does feature some small shops and restaurants that are mostly found in Fairfield Street. Yennora Oasis Hotel is a restaurant that features a dine-in and delivery service.

Recreational
Despite its small size, Yennora features a number of urban parks such as Springfield Park, Knight Park and Yennora Park, where they feature children's playgrounds, a sportsground and walking tracks.

Transport
Yennora railway station is on the Inner West & Leppington and Cumberland lines of the Sydney Trains network. Trains run frequently from Yennora to Leppington, Richmond and the City Circle. Yennora is also serviced by bus services operated by Transdev NSW.

Demographics
A high percentage (74.8%) of people spoke a language other than English at home, with Arabic (26.9%), Vietnamese (9.5%), Cantonese (3.0%), Spanish (2.6%) and Karen (2.6%), being the most commonly spoken non-English languages. Top ancestries were Lebanese (13.3%), Australian (10.9%), Vietnamese (9.2%), English (8.1%) and Chinese (7.9%). Common religions were Islam (26.1%), Catholic (20.3%), Not stated (15.6%), No Religion (10.4%) and Buddhism (8.8%). Christianity was the largest group religious group reported overall (42.7%).

The median age of people in Yennora was 43 years. With regards to employment, 42.4% of people were employed full-time, 27.4% were employed part-time, 18.7% were employed but away from work and 12.2% were unemployed. Furthermore, Yennora is known to be the most poorest suburb of Sydney, where the median personal income is just $19,000.

Gallery

References

External links

Suburbs of Sydney
City of Fairfield
Cumberland Council, New South Wales